Presidential Security Service may refer to:

Presidential Security Service (Belarus)
Presidential Security Service (Russia)
Presidential Security Service (South Korea)